Pauline MacMillan Keinath (born July 31, 1934 in Hennepin County, Minnesota) is an American billionaire heiress.

She is a great-granddaughter of William Wallace Cargill, the founder of Cargill, the largest private company in the US. Her father was Cargill MacMillan Sr. (1900-1968). She has two siblings, Whitney MacMillan (1929-2020) and Cargill MacMillan.

As of July 2020, she has a net wealth of $5.8 billion from an inherited 9% stake in Cargill.

In 2014, she was the 16th richest woman in the US. In 2022, her wealth made her the richest person in Missouri.

She is married, with four children, and  lives in St. Louis, Missouri.

References

American billionaires
Female billionaires
Cargill people
Living people
1934 births
People from Hennepin County, Minnesota
People from St. Louis